New Birth Missionary Baptist Church is a megachurch in unincorporated DeKalb County, Georgia, near Lithonia. It has embraced a Pentecostal theology not typically found in African-American Baptist churches.

History
The church was founded in 1939 in Scottdale as Travelers Rest Baptist Church.  In 1983, it moved to Decatur and adopted its current name. Eddie Long took over as pastor in 1987.  At the time, the church had only 300 members. Since his installation, membership has grown to 25,000.

In 2002, New Birth was chosen to host the live recording of Dorinda Clark-Cole, and was chosen by the family of rapper and R&B superstar Lisa Left Eye Lopes to host the funeral for the rapper, who was killed in a car accident in La Ceiba, Honduras.

In 2003, New Birth planted a branch called "New Birth Charlotte" in Charlotte, North Carolina.  That church no longer exists, and has since sold its building. Mecklenburg County records show the church defaulted on its payments to Evangelical Christian Credit Union for a $10 million loan.

On  August 15, 2004 the church opened a branch called "New Birth Memphis" in Memphis, Tennessee. The church has since closed and New Birth Memphis no longer exists.

Then in the future years, there were more churches such as New Birth Metro, New Birth Knoxville, New Birth Oakland, and New Birth California.

In 2006, the church was chosen by the family of Coretta Scott King, widow of Martin Luther King Jr., to host and officiate her funeral. The event was attended by four Presidents (George H. W. Bush, Bill Clinton, George W. Bush and Jimmy Carter).

On January 15, 2017, Bishop Eddie Long died from an aggressive form of cancer according to a statement released by the church. The church then announced Stephen A. Davis, pastor of New Birth Birmingham in Birmingham, Alabama would be Long's successor at New Birth Missionary Baptist Church in Lithonia while remaining pastor of the Birmingham. However in June, 2018  Bishop Davis resigned.

On November 19, 2018, the church announced Jamal Bryant, pastor of Empowerment Temple AME Church in Baltimore, Maryland would become the new pastor of New Birth. Pastor Bryant resigned as Pastor of Empowerment Temple in early December.

Controversies 
The church has also been marred by controversy, with four individuals filing separate lawsuits in DeKalb County Superior Court, Georgia alleging that Bishop Long used his pastoral influence to coerce them into a sexual relationship with him when they were teenagers.

References

External links

 New Birth Missionary Baptist Church

Evangelical megachurches in the United States
Megachurches in Georgia
Baptist churches in Georgia (U.S. state)
Buildings and structures in DeKalb County, Georgia